The long-nosed mosaic-tailed rat or Papuan lowland paramelomys (Paramelomys levipes) is a species of rodent in the family Muridae.
It is found only in Papua New Guinea.

References

 

Paramelomys
Endemic fauna of Papua New Guinea
Rodents of Papua New Guinea
Mammals described in 1897
Taxa named by Oldfield Thomas
Taxonomy articles created by Polbot
Rodents of New Guinea